The 19th Connecticut Regiment was a military regiment in the American Revolutionary War. It was formed in 1774 by an act of the Connecticut General Assembly and was authorized 11 companies of volunteers from Enfield, East Windsor, Bolton, and the part of Hartford on the East side of the Connecticut river of Hartford County, Connecticut. The rolls of eight of those companies survive. While General George Washington was reorganizing the Continental Army from December 1775 through February 1776, during the Siege of Boston,  Connecticut sent three regiments under Colonels James Wadsworth (10th Connecticut Regiment), Erastus Wolcott (19th Connecticut Regiment), and John Douglass (21st Connecticut Regiment). These regiments reached Boston in late January 1776 and remained for approximately six weeks.

Colonel Erastus Wolcott of Windsor commanded the 19th Connecticut Regiment from October 1774 - May 1777. Colonel Nathaniel Terry of Enfield commanded the regiment from May 1777 - 1783.

See also
1st Brigade, Connecticut Militia
10th Connecticut Regiment
21st Connecticut Regiment
Nathaniel Terry Sr

References

External links
Bibliography of Connecticut's participation in the Continental Army compiled by the United States Army Center of Military History

19th Regiment of Connecticut Militia